Mindstrip is the fourth album by the Belgian electro-industrial act Suicide Commando. The album was ranked #19 on the German Alternative Chart's (DAC) Top 50 albums of 2000 and peaked at #12 on the CMJ RPM Charts in the U.S.

Track listing

References

External links
Entry at Discogs.com

Suicide Commando albums
2000 albums